Turbo regenfusii, common name the great green turban, is a species of sea snail, a marine gastropod mollusk in the family Turbinidae, the turban snails.

This is a species inquirenda and is also considered a synonym of Turbo (Lunatica) marmoratus Linnaeus, C., 1758

Description
The length of the shell attains 220 mm.

Distribution
This species occurs in the Indian Ocean off Madagascar; also off the Fiji Islands.

References

 Dautzenberg, Ph. (1929). Contribution à l'étude de la faune de Madagascar: Mollusca marina testacea. Faune des colonies françaises, III(fasc. 4). Société d'Editions géographiques, maritimes et coloniales: Paris. 321-636, plates IV-VII pp.
 Alf A. & Kreipl K. (2003). A Conchological Iconography: The Family Turbinidae, Subfamily Turbininae, Genus Turbo. Conchbooks, Hackenheim Germany.

External links

 Deshayes, G.P. & Milne-Edwards, H. (1843). Histoire Naturelle des Animaux sans Vertèbres, présentant les caractères généraux et particuliers de ces animaux, leur distribution, leurs classes, leurs familles, leurs genres, et la citation des principales espèces qui s'y rapportent, par J. B. P. A. de Lamarck. Deuxième édition, Tome neuvième. Histoire des Mollusques. J. B. Baillière: Paris. 728 pp

regenfusii
Gastropods described in 1843